Total Dhamaal (also known as Dhamaal 3) is a 2019 Indian Hindi-language adventure comedy film directed and written by Indra Kumar and loosely based on the 1963 Hollywood film It's a Mad, Mad, Mad, Mad World with some scenes borrowed from the 2015 film Vacation and some from the 2014 film Blended. Being a third part of Dhamaal franchise, it is produced by Ajay Devgn FFilms, Markand Adhikari (Sri Adhikari Brothers), Fox Star Studios, Maruti International, Pen India Limited and Mangal Murti Films. The film has an ensemble cast of Ajay Devgn, Anil Kapoor, Madhuri Dixit, Arshad Warsi, Riteish Deshmukh and Jaaved Jaaferi with supporting cast of Boman Irani, Johnny Lever, Sanjay Mishra, Pitobash Tripathy and Manoj Pahwa and special appearance of Sonakshi Sinha in song Mungda. The trio of Deshmukh, Warsi and Jaaferi was part of previous two installments while Sanjay Dutt backed out and was replaced by Boman Irani, while Devgn, Dixit and Kapoor were new additions.

It received mixed reviews, with praise for its humor and performances, but criticism for its writing and second half.

This is the last film released by Fox Star Studios before the acquisition of 21st Century Fox by Disney, which was completed in March 2019.

Plot 
Guddu and his partner Johnny steal 50 crore of black money from Police Commissioner Shamsher Singh. When they try to escape, their associate Pintoo double-crosses them and drives away with money. Avinash and Bindu are troubled couple who file a divorce and argue over keeping their child. Lallan and Jhingur are partners who work in a fire brigade service where they try to bribe people and earn more money which leads to them being fired after causing a mishap while rescuing people from a house in fire. Adi and Manav find a job at an art gallery where they accidentally destroy the whole gallery and escape with the owner's advanced remote-controlled car.

Meanwhile, Pintoo plans to leave the country but Guddu and Johnny catch up to him. While running from them, Pintoo gets onto a private plane to escape but learns that instead of the pilot, he brought the janitor with him. The janitor escapes with the only parachute and the plane crashes. Coincidentally everyone arrives at the site of the crash where Pintoo reveals that the money is kept in the Janakpur Zoo by him and asks them to look under an OK. After learning about the money, everyone decides to grab the money for themselves. Guddu and Johnny's car breaks down and they wait on the road to find another car. Avinash drives the car into the forest while claiming he knows a shortcut. Lallan takes him and Jhingur to a nearby helicopter service. Adi and Manav use the stolen car to reach Janakpur. Guddu and Johnny find an advanced car with a sarcastic G.P.S system which leads them to wrong routes and ultimately leads the car down a steep slope and destroys the car. Avinash and Bindu get lost in the forest and meet a local villager who claims to know the route to highway. They both take him with them. Lallan and Jhingur arrive at the helicopter service where they travel on an old and broken helicopter of the owner which is on the verge of crashing. Adi crashes the car in a desert after getting distracted by an attractive woman and gets stuck in quicksand. Manav takes a snake and asks Adi to grab it to get out. Somehow Adi gets out and bashes Manav for not bringing the nearby rope. Soon, they get attacked by a flock of vulture. Guddu and Johnny come across the Police Commissioner who then chases them both to a railway crossing. Avinash and Bindu try to cross a wooden bridge to get to the other side which breaks down. After luckily avoiding falling into the cliff, they realize that the villager was instead leading them to a restaurant called Highway which leads Avinash to beat him. Guddu and Johnny escape the Commissioner when a train collides with their car. Lallan and Jhingur jump off the crashing helicopter and land on a building under construction. Adi and Manav mess up with the remote and barely escape the burning car. Avinash and Bindu try to cross a river which gets filled by water when the dam gets opened and get swept to the edge of the waterfall. Guddu and Johnny get on a plane which they believe is going on a swimming trip but soon find out that it is actually going for skydiving trip. The both reluctantly jump off the plane. After somehow escaping near-death scenarios, everyone reaches Janakpur Zoo where they start finding the hidden money. They see that a man named Chinappa Swamy is planning to illegally close the zoo by killing all the animals. When the caretaker Prachi disagrees, he locks her inside the control station. The group then sees that Chinappa's men are poisoning the animal's food to kill them. When Jhingur, Manav, Johnny and Bindu ask to save them, the group decides to save the animals. Guddu comes across a lion and succeeds in keeping him from eating the poisoned steak. Lallan and Jhingur try to stop a baby gorilla from eating the poisoned bananas but Lallan gets beaten up by the father gorilla. Lallan saves the gorillas by convincing them to not eat the bananas. Adi and Manav try to rescue a baby elephant which has eaten the poisoned sugarcanes. They save him but the elephant pukes on Adi and the elephants thank them. Avinash and Bindu try to stop a tiger from eating the poisoned steak but Bindu gets chased by the tiger and she escapes him by climbing up a tree. Avinash then succeeds in convincing the tiger. Prachi gets freed when her pet monkey Security opens the door. After successfully saving the animals, the group confronts Chinappa but get saved when Security holds a gun to Chinappa's face. The animals then chase Chinappa. The group finds the OK and decides to split the money equally between all of them. The Commissioner forgives Guddu and Johnny when he also receives the money. Avinash and Bindu forgive each other and decide to live happily together. Guddu falls in love with Prachi with Johnny asking if he can get a girlfriend too.

Cast 
 Ajay Devgn as Guddu Rastogi: He is a thief and Johnny's partner. Later on in the movie, he falls in love with Prachi.
 Anil Kapoor as Avinash "Avi" Patel: A businessman, he is Bindu's husband who has a strained relationship with her and tries for a divorce in the beginning but at the end, he accepts and decides to live happily with her.
 Madhuri Dixit as Bindiya "Bindu" Patel; A strong architect, she is Avinash's wife and has a strained relationship with him. At the end, she forgives and decides to live happily with him.
 Riteish Deshmukh as Deshbandhu "Lallan" Roy: A fire officer, he can do anything for money and tries to bribe people and earn more money.
 Arshad Warsi as Aditya "Adi" Srivastava; A taxi driver, he is Manav's twin brother and the intelligent person among the two.
 Javed Jaffrey as Manav Srivastava: He is Adi's mentally disabled twin brother, who has a childish personality and always causes trouble for the duo.
 Esha Gupta in a special appearance  as Prachi Malrotkar: The caretaker of the animals of Janakpur Zoo, she has a pet monkey and later in the movie becomes Guddu's love interest.
 Sanjay Mishra as Johnny D'Costa: A thief, he is Guddu's partner.
 Pitobash Tripathy as Jhingur: A fire officer, he is Lallan's sidekick.
 Johnny Lever as the comic pilot of Auto Chopper.
 Boman Irani as Shamsher 'Don' Singh: Police Commissioner, he is chasing Guddu and Johnny since the beginning of the film.
 Vijay Patkar as Abbas Patkar; Inspector, he is Don's partner.
 Manoj Pahwa as Pintu Choksey: He is Guddu and Johnny's former partner who betrayed them by taking Don's money and hiding it in Omkar Zoo.
 Mahesh Manjrekar as Chinappa Swamy: He illegally attempts to close down Omkar Zoo.
 Ali as "Nariyal Paani", the Tamil speaking jungle man: He leads Avi and Bindu to Hotel Highway, a South Indian restaurant.
 Crystal the Monkey as Security; He is Prachi's pet monkey.
 Sudesh Lehri as Altaaf
 Niharica Raizada as a woman with whom Adi falls in love.
 Hans Dev Sharma as Man who jumps from building set on fire and gives Lallan Bhai 200,000 as bribe to save him.
 Jackie Shroff as GPS (voice only).
 Sonakshi Sinha in a special appearance in the song 'Mungda'.

Production

Casting 
Besides Riteish Deshmukh, Arshad Warsi and Javed Jaffrey, director Indra Kumar signed Ajay Devgn for the third part of his Dhamaal film series in late May 2017. Anil Kapoor and Madhuri Dixit were also signed in mid-November 2017 marking their collaboration after seventeen years when they acted together in the film Pukar. Esha Gupta was signed in June 2018.

In late December 2017, Ajay Devgn FFilms collaborated with Fox Star Studios to produce the film. Pen India Limited and Mangl Murti Films came on board as co-producers.

Filming 
Principal photography commenced in Mumbai on 9 January 2018. The shooting was wrapped up in August 2018.

Music 

The film score was composed by Sandeep Shirodkar while the songs in the film were composed by Gourov-Roshin, with lyrics by Kumaar and Kunwar Juneja. Vatsal Chevli assisted in mixing all the songs. All songs mixed by Aftab at headroom studios.

Release

Theatrical 
The film was released on 22 February 2019 on 3700 screens in India and on 786 screens in overseas market making worldwide count of 4486 screens.
Earlier was set to release on 7 December 2018 but due to extended VFX work the release date has been pushed back to 22 February 2019. The film has been certified with runtime of 127 mins by British Board of Film Classification and all set to release on schedule. 

After Pulwama attack, Ajay Devgn and Total Dhamaal makers have decided not to release Total Dhamaal in Pakistan. The makers of the film including the entire crew, actors and makers have donated 50 lakhs to families of soldiers who died in the Pulwama attack.

Marketing 
The first teaser look of the film is released on 14 January 2019.
The first look theatrical poster was released on 18 January 2019. The second look poster released on 19 January 2019 with trailer release date announcement on 21 January 2019. Third official theatrical poster of the film is unveiled on 20 January 2019. It is promising "The wildest adventure ever!"

Two theatrical fresh look posters of the film are made public on 21 January 2019. These have pictures of main cast on it.

Home media 
The film became available as VOD on Disney+ Hotstar on 20 April 2019. The Blu-ray and DVD was also released in August 2019 by Shemaroo.

Reception

Box office 
The opening day (non-holiday) collection of the film from Indian market was 16.50 crore. Its lifetime domestic gross collection was 182.09 crore and from overseas markets it was 46.18 crore. The worldwide gross collection of the film was 2282.7 million. The film grossed  worldwide in three days of release. In opening week the film grossed . In 12 days of its release the film crossed  mark in gross collection.

Critical response 
Taran Adarsh rated the film with three stars and found it entertaining and loaded with clean humour. Himesh Mankad from Koimoi gives 3 star out of 5 says "Total Dhamaal is a fair clean entertainer that can be enjoyed with the entire family. It's definitely an improvement over previous installment Double Dhamaal". Trade analyst Sumit M Kadel stated that "Total Dhamaal is funny specially in Ist half. Its a no brainer fast paced family entertainer, lavishly shot & well performed by Ajay Devgn, Madhuri Dixit, Anil Kapoor, Riteish Deshmukh & the entire cast. 2nd half is moderate & it could have been better. Overall Good film." Rating- 3 out of 5 Ronak Kotecha writing for The Times of India gave two stars out of five and feels that in the ensemble cast, the film had the potential to be a comic roller coaster ride. He concluded saying "However, the fact that the film is slapstick is not a problem, what brings it down is poor writing and execution." Rajeev Masand of CNN-IBN gave 1.5 stars out of 5, commenting "I want to say here that I’m not against comedies that require complete suspension of disbelief. But even that requires thought, clever writing, and a lightness of touch. Total Dhamaal has none of those things. It’s a cash-grab film that believes ‘bigger is better’. Alas it’s not. From multiple remix songs, to the low-IQ racist and sexist humour, and a reliance on familiar gags and tropes, this is lazy, cynical filmmaking." Raja Sen writing for Hindustan Times rated the film with one star out of five.

Future

Full On Dhamaal (TBA) 
After the trailer release of Total Dhamaal, in an interview, director Indra Kumar said that another Dhamaal sequel is definitely on the cards and added that he has already registered two titles – Triple Dhamaal and Full On Dhamaal – for the next installment of the franchise. With the third film named Total Dhamaal, the fourth film will most probably be titled Full On Dhamaal.

References

External links 
 
 
 

2010s Hindi-language films
2019 films
2019 comedy films
Films shot in Mumbai
2010s adventure comedy films
Indian adventure comedy films
Films directed by Indra Kumar
Indian sequel films
Ajay Devgn
2010s masala films
Fox Star Studios films
Films set in jungles